Mark Morgan (born October 22, 1961) is an American musician and score composer for video games, television and films. He is known for his work in Fallout, Fallout 2, and Planescape: Torment, and for being a former member of Starship. He was born in Los Angeles, California, to an architect, Melford Morgan and Betty Morgan, a classically trained pianist. It was while living with his parents that he became interested in music, and started to learn to play the piano.

Upon graduating from high school, he moved to Boston, where he enrolled in the Berklee College of Music, where he studied piano and composition, and where he learned about electronic music. In 1988, he joined Starship on keyboards, played on the Love Among the Cannibals album with the band, and toured with them until 1990.

Albums 
Fade to Black (1987) (with Larry John McNally)
Love Among the Cannibals (1989) (with Starship)
So Many Routes (2004) (with Mike Sanchez)

Guest appearances
1987 - Roger Daltrey (on "Miracle of Love" and "The Heart Has Its Reasons" from Can't Wait to See the Movie)
1987 - Cher (on "Skin Deep" from Cher)
1994 - Stephen King's The Stand (Original Television Soundtrack)
1994 - My So-Called Life (Music from the Television Series)

Film
Where the Day Takes You (1992)
The Prophet's Game (2000)
Shark Attack 2 (2000) (direct-to-video)

Video games 
 Zork Nemesis (1995)
 Dark Seed II (1995)
 Shattered Steel (1996)
 Descent II (1996)
 Zork: Grand Inquisitor (1997)
 NetStorm: Islands At War (1997)
 Fallout (1997)
 Fallout 2 (1998)
 Planescape: Torment (1999)
 Civilization: Call to Power (1999)
 Giants: Citizen Kabuto (2000)
 Allods Online (2009)
 Need for Speed: Shift (2009)
 Wasteland 2 (2014)
 Prey 2 (canceled in 2014)
 Stasis (2015)
 Torment: Tides of Numenera (2017)
 The Bard's Tale IV: Barrows Deep (2018)
 Wasteland 3 (2020)

Television 
Homecoming (1996)
 Ink (1996)
 Prey (1998)
 Brimstone (1999)
 One Tree Hill (2003–2012)
 Hawaii (2004)
Helter Skelter (2004)
Odd Girl Out (2005)
 Kojak (2005)
 Killer Instinct (2005)
 Shark (2006–2008)

References

External links 
 Mark Morgan at MobyGames
 

1961 births
20th-century American keyboardists
Jefferson Starship members
American film score composers
American television composers
Living people
American male film score composers
Male television composers
Video game composers